Coleophora paravestalella is a moth of the family Coleophoridae.

References

paravestalella
Moths described in 1994